Katherine Bennett Ensor is an American statistician who specializes in numerous methods in computational and statistical analysis of time series data, stochastic process modeling and estimation to forecast issues in public health, community informatics, computational finance, and environmental statistics.

Ensor is the Noah G. Harding Professor of Statistics and Director of the Center for Computational Finance and Economic Systems at Rice University. She oversees the Kinder Institute Urban Data Platform, a data resource initiative for the greater Houston area that includes the Texas Flood and COVID-19 registries. She is also an investigator for Houston Wastewater Epidemiology, a SARS-CoV-2 Wastewater Monitoring Initiative that includes researchers at Rice University, the Houston Health Department, and the City of Houston.

Career and Research 
Ensor develops innovative statistical techniques to answer large dimension problems in science, engineering and business. In April 2020, she and researchers at Rice University, the Houston Health Department and the City of Houston, began conducting ongoing testing of the city’s wastewater treatment system for the presence of SARS-CoV-2, the virus that causes COVID-19. Ensor's research has also included the discovery of a correlation between ozone and heart attacks, and of geographic patterns in severe asthma attacks in schoolchildren.

Ensor advises on statistics and data science as a member of the National Academies' Committee on Applied and Theoretical Statistics, and is a member of the Board of Directors for the Institute for Mathematical and Statistical Innovation (IMSI). In 2020, she was named the 117th President American Statistical Association (ASA) and served as ASA Vice President from 2018 to 2019. She became a Fellow of the American Statistical Association in 2000, and of the American Association for the Advancement of Science in 2013.

Ensor earned bachelor's and master's degrees in mathematics from Arkansas State University in 1981 and 1982. She completed her Ph.D. in statistics in 1986 from Texas A&M University; her dissertation, supervised by H. Joseph Newton, was Some Results in Autoregressive Modeling. She has been on the Rice faculty since 1987.

References

External links
Rice University, Department of Statistics
Rice University, Ensor website
Rice University, Center for Computational Finance and Economic Systems (CoFES)
Houston Wastewater Epidemiology

Living people
American statisticians
Women statisticians
Arkansas State University alumni
Texas A&M University alumni
Rice University faculty
Fellows of the American Association for the Advancement of Science
Fellows of the American Statistical Association
Year of birth missing (living people)